Mamoun Hassan (12 December 1937 – 29 July 2022) was a Saudi-born British screenwriter, director, editor, producer and teacher of film who held prominent positions in British cinema during the 1970s and 1980s, frequently backing experimental work. He was the first head of production of the British Film Institute (BFI) and later managing director of the National Film Finance Corporation (NFFC).

Life and career
Mamoun Hassan was born in Jeddah, in Saudi Arabia on 12 December 1937. He began his career in film working as an editing assistant with Kevin Brownlow. He made his first distributed short film 'The Meeting', in1965, for which he was awarded a best prize award at the Oberhausen Film Festival. He was the first head of production of the British Film Institute from 1971, in which post he instigated the BFI's policy of backing low-budget feature films that charted in new directions; he assisted the director Bill Douglas by securing crew and funding to make The Bill Douglas Trilogy (1972–78), and financially supported the production of Winstanley (1975). Hassan was the first to support film that was made by Black British filmmakers about their experiences in Britain: Horace Ove's Pressure. After leaving the BFI he taught at the National Film and Television School at Beaconsfield. In 1979 he wrote a policy paper for AIP (of which he was a founder member) on the future of the National Film Finance Corporation, which led to him being appointed to the board by the Minister of Trade and Industry. Subsequent to this, he was appointed Managing Director. In this position he backed the film Babylon (1980), Gregory's Girl, Britannia Hospital, Raymond Briggs' When the Wind Blows and again helped Douglas in the production of Comrades (1986). When he wasn't able to support film directly, he would use his influence to ensure they were made. These include Merchant Ivory's Heat and Dust and Merry Christmas Mr Lawrence. Despite the "brave funding choices" and renewed creativity of the NFFC under Hassan, it was abolished in 1985. Afterwards he worked as a film producer, screenwriter, consultant, lecturer and teacher in the field of cinema.

Hassan died on 29 July 2022, at the age of 84.

Filmography

Television Credits

References

External links

Official website

1937 births
2022 deaths
British film directors
British male screenwriters
People from Jeddah
Saudi Arabian emigrants to the United Kingdom